Maria Suzette Sevilla Ranillo (born January 11, 1961) is a Filipino actress who started at the age of 12 as an actress with the screen name, Nadia Veloso. She is well known for her awards and successes in film, television and theater.

Biography 
Born in Cebu City, Philippines to actors Mat Ranillo, Jr. and Gloria Sevilla (who later wed Amado Cortez). Her siblings are Maria Lilibeth Sevilla Ranillo a.k.a. Bebet Ranillo DeRivera, Matias Archibald Sevilla Ranillo III, to his friends and family "Archie," (a.k.a. Mat Ranillo III), Matias Jonathan Sevilla Ranillo IV a.k.a. Jojo Ranillo, Matias Bonifacio Sevilla Ranillo V a.k.a. Dandin Ranillo, Matias Junius Ferdinand Sevilla Ranillo VI a.k.a. Juni Ging Ranillo and Czareanah Mari Sevilla Cortez a.k.a. Inah Cortez Do.

Filmography
 Pagbalik (Nuances Entertainment Productions, Pro Pro and Solar Pictures) Directed by Hubert Tibi and Suzette Ranillo as Maria S. Ranillo. 2019.
 Siargao (Ten17P and Solar Pictures) Directed by Paul Soriano. 2017.
 Tiniente Gimo (KIB Productions, RMS Productions and Viva Films). Directed by Ronald M. Sanchez. 2016.
 In Progress (SR Films) . Directed by Suzette Ranillo. 2008.
 CareHome (GGS Entertainment) . Directed by Suzette Ranillo. 2006.
 I Will Always Love You (Regal Films). Directed by Mac Alejandre. 2005.
 Kristo (CineSuerte). Directed by Ben Yalung. 1996. Film Academy of the Philippines Best Picture Nominee.
 Segurista (Neo Films). Directed by Jose Aguiluz. 1995. Entry to Toronto Film Festival (Canada).
 Muling Umawit Ang Puso (Viva Films). Directed by Joel Lamangan. 1995. Metro Manila Film Festival Best Supporting Actress Nominee.
 Trudis Liit (Merdeka Films). Directed by Jett Espiritu. 1993. Metro Manila Film Festival Best Supporting Actress Nominee.
 Kumander Alibasbas (JE Productions). Directed by Augusto Buenaventura. 1981. Filipino Academy of Movie Arts and Sciences (FAMAS) Best Picture Awardee.
 Taga Sa Panahon (Premiere Productions). Directed by Augusto Buenaventura. 1980. FAMAS Best Supporting Actress Nominee.
 Aliw / Pleasure (Seven Stars Production). Directed by Ishmael Bernal. 1979. Urian Best Actress Nominee.
 Gimingaw Ako (Kampilan Films). Directed by Amado Cortez. 1973. FAMAS Best Supporting Actress Awardee.

Theater

 Kanser ("Noli Me Tangere"). Role: Sisa. Metropolitan Theatre, Philippines. 1990–1992; 2003–2004.
 Kristo. Role: Veronica / Weeping Women. Folk Arts Theatre, Philippines. 1994–1999.
 El Filibusterismo. Role: Juli. Metropolitan Theatre/Little CCP (Cultural Center of the Philippines). 1992–1994.
 Florante at Laura". Role: Laura. Metropolitan Theatre, Philippines. 1992.
 Bong Bong at Kris. Role: Ate Guy. Ateneo Graduate School, Philippines. 1991.

Television
 2019 The Better Woman as Corina "Coring" Magpugay [GMA Network]
 2019 Kadenang Ginto as Pilar [ABS-CBN]
 2015 Ang Probinsyano as Dely [ABS-CBN]
 2015 Nathaniel as aunt of Rachel [ABS-CBN]
 2003 Sana'y Wala Nang Wakas. [ABS-CBN]
 2003 Pangako Sa 'Yo. [ABS-CBN] 
 Sali-Salising Buhay ("Interwoven Lives") 
 Lucia''. (BBC). Directed by Mel Chonglo. 1992. Gawad CCP Best Drama for TV Awardee. Cannes Film Festival Best Docu-Drama Awardee.

Awards and nominations

Personal recognition

 1996 Metro Manila Film Festival Best Supporting Actress Nominee. "Trudis Liit" (Merdeka Films). 
 1995 Metro Manila Film Festival Best Supporting Actress Nominee. "Mulang Umawit ang Puso" (Viva Films). 
 1980 FAMAS Best Supporting Actress Nominee. "Taga Sa Panahon" (Premiere Productions). 
1979 Urian Best Actress Nominee. "Aliw" /(Pleasure) (Seven Stars Production). 
 1975 FAMAS Best Supporting Actress Awardee. "Gimingaw Ako" (Kampilan Films).

Recognition of projects

 1997. Metro Manila Film Festival 2nd Best Picture, Best Story, Best Theme Song, and Best Supporting Actress. "Babae" ("Woman"). 
 1996 Film Academy of the Philippines Best Picture Nominee. "Kristo" (CineSuerte). 
 1995 Entry to Toronto Film Festival (Canada). "Segurista" (Neo Films). 
 1992 Cannes Film Festival Best Docu-Drama Awardee. Gawad CCP Best Drama for TV Awardee. "Lucia". (BBC). Directed by Mel Chonglo.
 1981 FAMAS Best Picture Awardee. "Kumander Alibasbas"

References

Living people
Suzette
People from Cebu City
Actresses from Cebu
1961 births
Filipino stage actresses
Visayan people